Tracy Lawrence is an American country music singer. His discography comprises fourteen studio albums, one live album, eight compilation albums, one box set, and 46 singles. Of his albums, the highest-certified are 1993's Alibis and 1996's Time Marches On, each certified 2× platinum by the Recording Industry Association of America (RIAA).

Lawrence made his debut in late 1991 on Atlantic Records with the single "Sticks and Stones", which topped the Billboard charts in January 1992. Following this song came several more top ten country hits, including four straight number ones from Alibis, and one each from I See It Now and Time Marches On. The title track of the latter album is also his longest-lasting number one, at three weeks. His chart success waned in 1997 when "The Coast Is Clear" stalled at number 26 on the country charts, and he did not return to the top 40 again until late 1999–early 2000 with "Lessons Learned", the title track to his final Atlantic album. A largely unsuccessful self-titled album was released in 2001 via Warner Bros. Records Nashville after Atlantic closed its country division, followed by 2004's Strong on the DreamWorks Records label, which produced the number 4 "Paint Me a Birmingham".

After a greatest-hits package on Mercury Records, Lawrence founded his own label, Rocky Comfort Records. The label's first release, "Find Out Who Your Friends Are", became his eighth U.S. number one, as well as the slowest-climbing country number one in the history of the Billboard charts. The album's other singles, however, failed to match the success of the lead-off single.

Studio albums

1990s

2000s

2010s and 2020s

Compilation albums

Live albums

Holiday albums

Box sets

Singles

1991–2000

2001–2010

2011–present

Other singles

Other charted songs

Featured singles

Videography

Music videos

Guest appearances

Miscellaneous appearances

Notes

References

Lawrence, Tracy discography
Discographies of American artists